A hydroxynaphthoquinone is any of several organic compounds that can be viewed as derivatives of a naphthoquinone through replacement of one hydrogen atom (H) by a hydroxyl group (-OH).

In this case the number n (which is between 1 and 6) is indicated by a multiplier prefix (mono-, di-, tri-, tetra-, penta-, or hexa-).

The unqualified term "hydroxynaphthoquinone" usually means a derivative of 1,4-naphthoquinone.  Other hydroxy- compounds can be derived from other isomers of the latter, such as 1,2-naphthoquinone and 2,6-naphthoquinone.  The IUPAC nomenclature uses dihydronaphthalenedione instead of "naphthoquinone", with the necessary prefixes to indicate the positions of the carbonyl oxygens (=O) — as in 5,8-dihydroxy-1a,8a-dihydronaphthalene-1,4-dione (= 5,8-dihydroxy-1,4-naphthoquinone).

The hydroxynaphtoquinones (in the particular or the general sense) include many biologically and industrially important compounds, and are a building-block of many medicinal drugs.

(Mono)hydroxynaphtoquinones

From 1,4-naphthoquinone
Due to its symmetry there are only three isomers:

2-Hydroxy-1,4-naphthoquinone (lawsone), coloring principle of henna.
5-Hydroxy-1,4-naphthoquinone (juglone), coloring principle of black walnut. Also active antimicrobial principle in Caesalpinia sappan heartwood.
6-Hydroxy-1,4-naphthoquinone, can be prepared from 1,7-dihydroxynaphthalene.  One of the main products of photochemical oxidation of 1-naphthol.

From 1,2-naphthoquinone
From 1,2-naphthoquinone (ortho-naphthoquinone) there are 6 possible isomers:
3-Hydroxy-1,2-naphthoquinone
4-Hydroxy-1,2-naphthoquinone
5-Hydroxy-1,2-naphthoquinone
6-Hydroxy-1,2-naphthoquinone
7-Hydroxy-1,2-naphthoquinone
8-Hydroxy-1,2-naphthoquinone

From 2,3-naphthoquinone
From 2,3-naphthoquinone, also a symmetric molecule there are only three isomers:
1-Hydroxy-2,3-naphthoquinone
5-Hydroxy-1,2-naphthoquinone
6-Hydroxy-1,2-naphthoquinone

From 2,6-naphthoquinone
From the symmetrical 2,6-naphthoquinone (amphi-naphthoquinone) there are only three:

1-Hydroxy-2,6-naphthoquinone
3-Hydroxy-2,6-naphthoquinone
4-Hydroxy-2,6-naphthoquinone

(Poly)hydroxynaphthoquinones
Dihydroxynaphthoquinone
Trihydroxynaphthoquinone
Tetrahydroxynaphthoquinone
Pentahydroxynaphthoquinone
Hexahydroxynaphthoquinone

See also
Hydroxybenzoquinone
Hydroxyanthraquinone

References

Hydroxynaphthoquinones